Willy Bernath (1 March 1914 – 13 June 1991) was a Swiss cross-country skier. He competed in the men's 18 kilometre event at the 1936 Winter Olympics.

References

External links
 

1914 births
1991 deaths
Swiss male cross-country skiers
Swiss male Nordic combined skiers
Olympic cross-country skiers of Switzerland
Olympic Nordic combined skiers of Switzerland
Cross-country skiers at the 1936 Winter Olympics
Nordic combined skiers at the 1936 Winter Olympics
People from La Chaux-de-Fonds
Sportspeople from the canton of Neuchâtel